The Day of Revenge ( Yūm al-Intiqāmi) was a Libyan holiday celebrating the expulsion of Italians from Libyan soil in 1970. Some sources also claim that the 1948-67 departure of Libyan Jews was also celebrated. 

It was cancelled in 2004 after Silvio Berlusconi apologized for Italian colonization in Libya, but reintroduced the next year. Later, it was renamed the Day of Friendship because of improvement in Italy–Libya relations.

See also 
 1970 expulsion of Italians from Libya
 Jewish exodus from the Muslim world#Libya
 History of Libya under Muammar Gaddafi
 Italian settlers in Libya
 Italian refugees from Libya
 Cultural Revolution in Libya

References

 Angelo Del Boca, The Italians in Libya, from Fascism to Gaddafy. Bari: Laterza, 1991.

Antisemitism in Libya
History of Libya under Muammar Gaddafi
Expulsions of Jews
Italy–Libya relations
Public holidays in Libya
Racism in Libya
Anti-Italian sentiment
Jewish exodus from Arab and Muslim countries
20th-century Judaism
1970 in Libya
October observances